Charles Huntington Whitman (November 24, 1873 – December 27, 1937) was the Chair of the Department of English at Rutgers University for 26 years (1911–1937) and a noted scholar of Edmund Spenser and early English verse.

Biography
Whitman was born in Abbot, Maine, to Nathan Whitman and Helen Augusta Thoms but attended Bangor High School in Bangor, Maine (Class of 1892) before obtaining his B.A. from Colby College in 1897. In 1900, he received a PhD from Yale University for a dissertation on The Birds in Old English Literature. In the same year, he completed a translation of Cynewulf's The Christ, a companion to Yale professor Albert Stanburrough Cook's critical edition of the poem. Whitman went on to take an Assistant Professorship at Lehigh University.  He was invited to Rutgers University in 1906, and accepted the Chair of the Rutgers University English Department in 1911, a position he maintained until his death.  His tenure saw many reforms, most importantly the creation of a graduate program, the doubling in size of the faculty, and a transition from declamation to composition and analysis. At the time of this death he was considered "one of the most popular professors at the university". 

Whitman was married to Rachel Jones Foster in 1902, and they had four children: Hilda Trull (b. 1908), Alan Foster (b. 1909), Dunbar (b. 1912), and Esther Huntington (b. 1917). He died from a coronary thrombosis on December 27, 1937, at his home in Highland Park, New Jersey.

Bibliography

Translations
The Christ of Cynewulf (Ginn and Company, 1900)

Reference works
The Birds of Old English Literature (The Journal of Germanic Philology, 1898)
Old English Mammal Names (The Journal of Germanic Philology, 1907)
A Subject Index to the Poems of Edmund Spenser (Yale, 1919; Russell & Russell, 1966)

Reviews
The Literature of New Jersey (American Historical Society, 1930)

Edited volumes
Seven Contemporary Plays (Houghton-Mifflin, 1931; 1959)
Representative Modern Dramas (Macmillan, 1936)

References

1873 births
People from Bangor, Maine
1937 deaths
Colby College alumni
Yale University alumni
American academics of English literature
Rutgers University faculty
Lehigh University faculty
People from Piscataquis County, Maine
Bangor High School (Maine) alumni